Lifer is a person sentenced to life imprisonment, also a person who makes a career of one of the armed forces, or a person who has made a lifelong commitment (as to a way of life).

Lifer or Lifers may also refer to:

Music
 Lifer (band) was an American rock band
 "Lifer", a song by Down, from the album NOLA
 "Lifer", a 2016 song by Florida Georgia Line
 Lifer (album), a 2017 album by MercyMe
 Lifers, a 2018 album by Cody Jinks
 Lifers (album), a 2020 album by Local H

Film and television
 Lifer (2014 film), a 2014 short film by Ervin Chartrand